Margaret Veley (12 May 1843 – 7 December 1887) was a British author and poet. Born in Braintree, Essex to Augustus Charles Veley and Sophia Ludbey, she was second in a family of four daughters. She never married. She died in her early forties after a short illness "caused by a chill and ending in an affection of the throat."

Career 

Margaret Veley's writing ranged from short and long fiction to poetry. During the 1870s and 1880s, she published short stories for magazines, three novels, and a two-volume collection of stories. After her early death, a volume of her poetry was issued. Although earlier works included elements of romance and humour, her later works were deemed melancholy and depressing, a tone which was ascribed to the premature deaths of her father and two sisters.

Works 
For Percival. 1878
Having the theme womanly self-sacrifice, it appeared serially in the Cornhill Magazine. It was published in three volumes in the latter year.
Mrs. Austin. 1880
Rachel's inheritance; or, Damocles.  882
Mitchelhurst Place. 1884
A Marriage of Shadows and Other Poems. 1888 by Sir Leslie Stephen.

References

Sources 
Veley, Margaret, and Leslie Stephen. A Marriage of Shadows and Other Poems. Philadelphia: J.B. Lippincott, 1900. googlebooks Retrieved 20 May 2009
"Veley, Margaret." British Authors of the Nineteenth Century. H.W. Wilson Co., New York, 1936

External links
 
 

1843 births
1887 deaths
English women poets
19th-century English poets
19th-century English women writers
19th-century British writers